The 1940 Saint Mary's Gaels football team was an American football team that represented Saint Mary's College of California during the 1940 college football season.  In their first season under head coach Red Strader, the Gaels compiled a 5–3 record and outscored their opponents by a combined total of 100 to 68.

Schedule

References

Saint Mary's
Saint Mary's Gaels football seasons
Saint Mary's Gaels football